Euzerconidae is a family of mites in the order Mesostigmata.

Species
Euzerconidae contains twelve genera, with 20 recognized species:

 Genus Euzercon Berlese, 1888
 Euzercon anatonon Hunter & Rosario, 1991
 Euzercon balzani Berlese, 1888
 Euzercon brachys Hunter & Rosario, 1991
 Euzercon brasiliensis Wisniewski & Hirschmann, 1992
 Euzercon dolichos Hunter & Rosario, 1991
 Euzercon hyatti Hunter & Rosario, 1991
 Euzercon latus (Banks, 1909)
 Euzercon subtermion Hunter & Rosario, 1991
 Genus Etazercon P. E. Hunter & R. M. T. Rosario, 1989
 Etazercon starri P. E. Hunter & R. M. T. Rosario, 1989
 Genus Euzerconiella J. Wisniewski & W. Hirschmann, 1992
 Euzerconiella ghanae J. Wisniewski & W. Hirschmann, 1992
 Genus Euzerconoides R. C. Funk, 1980
 Euzerconoides eta R. C. Funk, 1980
 Euzerconoides columbiensis Wisniewski & Hirschmann, 1992
 Genus Karkinoeuzercon R. C. Funk, 1980
 Karkinoeuzercon epsilon R. C. Funk, 1980
 Genus Microeuzercon R.C.Funk, 1976
 Microeuzercon alpha R.C.Funk, 1976
 Genus Neoeuzercon R. C. Funk, 1980
 Neoeuzercon diplopodophilus R. C. Funk, 1980
 Genus Paraeuzercon R. C. Funk, 1980
 Paraeuzercon delta R. C. Funk, 1980
 Genus Pseudoeuzercon R. C. Funk, 1980
 Pseudoeuzercon seeversi R. C. Funk, 1980
 Genus Synaptoeuzercon R. C. Funk, 1980
 Synaptoeuzercon zeta R. C. Funk, 1980
 Genus Trichotoeuzercon R. C. Funk, 1980
 Trichotoeuzercon nu R. C. Funk, 1980
 Genus Trinizercon P. E. Hunter & R. M. T. Rosario, 1989
 Trinizercon atyeoi P. E. Hunter & R. M. T. Rosario, 1989

References

Mesostigmata
Acari families